Pecom 64 was an educational and/or home computer developed by Elektronska Industrija Niš of Serbia in 1985.

Specifications 

 CPU: CDP 1802B 5V7 running at 2.813 MHz
 ROM: 16 KB, with optional 16 KB upgrade containing enhanced editor and assembler
 RAM:               32 KB
 Secondary storage: cassette tape
VIS:                    (Video Interface System) CDP1869/CDP1870
Text modes:             40 columns x 24 lines
Character set:          128 Programmable characters
Character size:         6x9
Graphics modes:         None, but the character-set was re programmable to simulate a 240x216 High Resolution display
Colours:                A total of 8 foreground colours are available (with a limited choice of 4 per character and 1 per line of that character) and 8 background colours (defined for the whole screen).
 Sound:                 2 channels: one for tone generation with a span of 8 octaves, and 1 for special effect/white noise. Volume programmable in 16 steps.
 I/O ports:         cassette tape storage, composite and RF video, RS-232 and expansion connector
 Power supply:      220 V AC, 0.02 A, 4.5 W (built-in transformer)

See also 

 Pecom 32
 Very similar HW and BASIC as used in the Comx-35

External links 
 Old-Computers.com
 Retrospec.sgn.net - games in audio format
 Emma 02 including Pecom 64 Emulator

Home computers
EI Niš